"Close to Your Heart" is the debut single by Japanese singer-songwriter Rina Aiuchi.  It was released on 23 March 2000 through Giza Studio, as the lead single from her debut album Be Happy. The song served as the theme song to the Japanese animated television series Monster Rancher.

The single was released in four versions with different colors of the cover: pink, white, yellow, and purple. All the versions include the same tracks.

Commercial performance
"Close to Your Heart" reached at number nineteen on the Oricon Weekly Singles Chart, selling 64,000 physical copies.

Track listing

Charts

Certification and sales

|-
! scope="row"| Japan (RIAJ)
| 
| 64,000
|-
|}

Release history

References

2000 debut singles
2000 songs
J-pop songs
Songs written by Aika Ohno
Anime songs
Giza Studio singles
Song recordings produced by Daiko Nagato
Songs written by Rina Aiuchi